The IIT Bombay Industrial Design Centre School of Design (IITB IDC School of Design) is a design school part of the Indian Institute of Technology Bombay, a public research university in Powai, Mumbai. It offers four-year Bachelor of Design (B.Des.) and two-year Master of Design (M.Des.) programmes, a five-year integrated Bachelor's plus Master's in design programme, and doctoral programmes (PhD) in design across various disciplines such as industrial design, communication design, animation and automobile design.

Notable faculty 
 Prof. R. K. Joshi
 Prof. Ravi Poovaiah
 Prof. Shilpa Ranade
 Prof. Nina Sabnani

Notable alumni
 Pranav Mistry - inventor of 6th sense and Global Vice President of Research at Samsung
 Satyendra Pakhale - of Pakhale Associates
 Udaya Kumar - designer of the Indian rupee sign

References

External links
 IDC official site

IIT Bombay
Design schools in India
Educational institutions established in 1969
Education in Mumbai
1969 establishments in Maharashtra
Industrial design
Universities and colleges in Mumbai